Roosa Funmilayo Ariyo (born 13 June 1994) is a Finnish-born Nigerian professional footballer who plays as a forward for Belgian side Club YLA and the Nigeria women's national team.

Early life
Ariyo was raised in Helsinki and Espoo. Her father is Nigerian and her mother is Finnish.

College career
Ariyo has attended the Monroe Community College and the University of Bridgeport in the United States.

Club career
Ariyo has played for FC Honka and Tikkurilan Palloseura in Finland and for Jitex BK in Sweden.

International career
Ariyo made her senior debut for Nigeria on 10 June 2021 in a 0–1 friendly loss to Jamaica.

References

External links 

1994 births
Living people
Citizens of Nigeria through descent
Nigerian women's footballers
Women's association football forwards
Jitex BK players
Monroe Community College alumni
Bridgeport Purple Knights women's soccer players
College women's soccer players in the United States
UD Granadilla Tenerife players
Real Betis Féminas players
Club Brugge KV (women) players
Primera División (women) players
Nigeria women's international footballers
Nigerian expatriate women's footballers
Nigerian expatriate sportspeople in Sweden
Expatriate women's footballers in Sweden
Nigerian expatriate sportspeople in the United States
Expatriate women's soccer players in the United States
Nigerian expatriate sportspeople in Spain
Expatriate women's footballers in Spain
Nigerian expatriate sportspeople in Belgium
Expatriate women's footballers in Belgium
Yoruba sportswomen
Nigerian people of European descent
Nigerian people of Finnish descent
Footballers from Helsinki
Footballers from Espoo
Finnish women's footballers
FC Honka (women) players
Kansallinen Liiga players
Finland women's youth international footballers
Finnish expatriate footballers
Finnish expatriate sportspeople in Sweden
Finnish expatriate sportspeople in the United States
Finnish expatriate sportspeople in Spain
Finnish expatriate sportspeople in Belgium
Finnish people of Nigerian descent
Finnish people of Yoruba descent